The Ministry of National Defence is charged with supervising all agencies and functions of the government relating directly to national security and the Royal Cambodian Armed Forces. It is Cambodia's ministry of defence. The current Minister of National Defence is Tea Banh.

Administrative areas
The Ministry of National Defence is divided into six administrative areas.

High Command Headquarters of the Royal Cambodian Armed Forces
Army HQ – Royal Cambodian Army
Navy HQ – Royal Cambodian Navy
Air Force HQ – Royal Cambodian Air Force
Gendarmerie HQ – Royal Cambodian Gendarmerie

History

Prior to 1970
Prior to March 1970, the Forces armées royales khmères (FARK) General Staff was under the command and control of the Supreme Commander of the Armed Forces, and the Head of State. At that time, then Prince Norodom Sihanouk held both titles. The General Staff controlled the three Services with its headquarters also serving as headquarters and staff for the Army.

Football team
The ministry also maintains a football team. Their club called the National Defense Ministry FC plays in the top division of Cambodian football, the C-League. They are tied with most Cambodian League Championships at three.

List of ministers

See also
Government of Cambodia
Royal Cambodian Armed Forces

References

External links
Ministry of National Defence
Ministry of National Defence - directory of areas, departments and key personnel

Military of Cambodia
Cambodia
Government ministries of Cambodia
Ministries established in 1953
1953 establishments in Cambodia